Farington is a surname. Notable people with the surname include:

Anthony Farington or Anthony Farindon (1598–1658), English royalist divine
George Farington (1752–1788), English artist, brother of Joseph Farington
Joseph Farington (1747–1821), English artist, brother of George Farington
Sir Richard Farington, 1st Baronet (c. 1644–1719), English politician